Huntington station is an Amtrak station in Huntington, West Virginia.  Located at 1050 8th Avenue, the station consists of a platform on the south side of the east-west tracks, a small parking lot, and a small building in between.  The station contains a waiting room and space for a ticket office, though Amtrak pulled the station agent in the 21st century.  Huntington is served by the Cardinal route. The Amtrak station replaced a Chesapeake and Ohio station on 7th Avenue. The C&O station hosted daily trains headed northwest, west and east: Fast Flying Virginian (west to Cincinnati, and sections east to Washington, D.C. and Newport News), George Washington (sections west to Cincinnati and Louisville, and sections east to Washington, D.C. and Newport News) and the Sportsman (northwest to Detroit, and sections east to Washington, D.C. and Newport News).

The one story Amtrak building was constructed to a standard design that Amtrak developed in the 1970s and used at locations throughout the country for the next two decades. Typical features included at Huntington are concrete block walls, floor to ceiling windows and a black, cantilevered roof.

Transit connections

The Huntington station is located six blocks south and two blocks west of the Tri-State Transit Authority Transit Center. Most TTA bus routes and the Greyhound Bus stop at that station. For closer connections, riders can take advantage of TTA Routes 2, 4, 5, 6, 10, which pass two blocks of the station at 4th Avenue. Those connections are not always practical under current Cardinal schedule. The passengers who arrive on the eastbound train from Chicago can easily transfer to any route that serves the Transit Center, most bus routes don't start running until the train departs. Except for the few PM routes, most TTA routes stop running hours before the westbound train arrives, limiting options for any passengers who are either boarding or disembarking from the train.

References

External links

Huntington Amtrak Station (USA Rail Guide – Train Web)

Amtrak stations in West Virginia
Buildings and structures in Huntington, West Virginia
Stations along Chesapeake and Ohio Railway lines
Railway stations in West Virginia
Transportation in Cabell County, West Virginia
Bus stations in West Virginia